Onkabetse Makgantai (born 1 July 1995) is a Motswana footballer who plays for Orapa United and the Botswana national football team.

He moved from  Orapa United to AS Vita in 2016 to play for the DRC Super Ligue outfit.

International career
Makgantai has scored eight times for Botswana, the most recent goal coming in a 2–0 win against Swaziland.

In June 2018, Makgantai won the top goalscorer prize of the 2018 COSAFA Cup after he netted five times in his side’s six games.

In November 2019 he was one of four Botswana international players dropped from the national team after they had been drinking alcohol.

International goals
As of match played on 5 June 2018. Botswana score listed first; score column indicates score after each Makgantai goal.

References

1995 births
Living people
Botswana footballers
Botswana international footballers
Nico United players
Orapa United F.C. players
AS Vita Club players
Baroka F.C. players
Association football forwards
Botswana expatriate footballers
Expatriate footballers in the Democratic Republic of the Congo
Botswana expatriate sportspeople in the Democratic Republic of the Congo
Expatriate soccer players in South Africa
Botswana expatriate sportspeople in South Africa
Linafoot players
South African Premier Division players